The 2010 Zolder Formula Two round was the fourth round of the 2010 FIA Formula Two Championship season. It was held on June 19, 2010 and June 20, 2010 in Zolder, Belgium.

Classification

Qualifying 1

Qualifying 2

Race 1

Race 2

References

FIA Formula Two Championship